Jan Kraus (born 28 August 1979) is a retired professional Czech football player who played more than 150 matches in the Czech First League. During his career he spent a season in South Korea, playing for Daegu FC in the 2003 K League.

References

External links
 
 
 

1979 births
Living people
Czech footballers
Czech Republic youth international footballers
Czech Republic under-21 international footballers
Association football forwards
Czech First League players
FC Hradec Králové players
FC Viktoria Plzeň players
FK Baník Most players
FC Fastav Zlín players
K League 1 players
Daegu FC players
Czech expatriate footballers
Expatriate footballers in South Korea